The following events occurred in January 1954:

January 1, 1954 (Friday)
The Soviet Union ceases to demand war reparations from Germany.
According to a 1953 press statement by Bolesław Bierut, General Secretary of the Polish United Workers' Party, Poland renounced all claims to war reparations from Germany as of January 1, 1954. However, as of 2022 the position of the Polish government is that Poland did not renounce its claim to reparations.

January 2, 1954 (Saturday)

January 3, 1954 (Sunday)
The Italian broadcaster RAI officially begins transmitting.
In the United States, the last steam-driven passenger train leaves Washington Union Station for Richmond, Virginia.
Born: Ned Lamont, American politician, Governor of Connecticut, in Washington, D.C.

January 4, 1954 (Monday)
Born: Tina Knowles, US fashion designer, in Galveston, Texas

January 5, 1954 (Tuesday)
Died:
Rabbit Maranville, 62, US baseball player (Boston Braves)
Lillian Rich, 54, English actress

January 6, 1954 (Wednesday)
A Royal Air Force Vickers Valetta T3 training aircraft, carrying members of a rugby team, crashes at Albury, Hertfordshire, UK, in bad weather. Two of the 17 people on board are rescued, but only one survives.

January 7, 1954 (Thursday)
The Georgetown–IBM experiment, the first public demonstration of a machine translation system (from Russian to English), takes place in New York.

January 8, 1954 (Friday)
Died: Eduard Wiiralt, 55, Estonian artist

January 9, 1954 (Saturday)

January 10, 1954 (Sunday)

BOAC Flight 781, a de Havilland Comet jet plane, disintegrates in mid-air due to metal fatigue and crashes in the Mediterranean near Elba, killing all 35 people on board.

January 11, 1954 (Monday)
Died:
John Simon, 1st Viscount Simon, British politician (b. 1873)
Oscar Straus, Austrian composer (b. 1870)

January 12, 1954 (Tuesday)
Blons avalanches in Austria kill 125 people.
Died:
William H. P. Blandy, American admiral (b. 1890)
Elmer H. Geran, American politician (b. 1875)

January 13, 1954 (Wednesday)

January 14, 1954 (Thursday)

Marilyn Monroe marries baseball player Joe DiMaggio.

January 15, 1954 (Friday)
British troops capture Mau Mau leader Waruhiu Itote in Kenya.

January 16, 1954 (Saturday)

January 17, 1954 (Sunday)
Milovan Djilas is removed from his position as President of the Federal Assembly of Yugoslavia after 22 days.

January 18, 1954 (Monday)
Died: Sydney Greenstreet, 74, English actor

January 19, 1954 (Tuesday)
Born: Yumi Matsutōya, Japanese singer-songwriter, in Hachiōji, suburb of Tokyō

January 20, 1954 (Wednesday)

The Tokyo Metro Marunouchi Line, the second line in the system and the first built after World War II, is opened between Ikebukuro and Ochanomizu stations.
Chicago businessman W. Leonard Evans Jr. establishes the US-based National Negro Network with forty-six member radio stations.
Died: Fred Root, English cricketer (b. 1890)

January 21, 1954 (Thursday)
The first nuclear-powered submarine, the USS Nautilus, is launched in Groton, Connecticut, by First Lady of the United States Mamie Eisenhower.

January 22, 1954 (Friday)

January 23, 1954 (Saturday)

January 24, 1954 (Sunday)

January 25, 1954 (Monday)
The foreign ministers of the United States, the United Kingdom, France and the Soviet Union meet at the Berlin Conference, which lasts until February 18. Its purpose is to discuss a settlement to the recent Korean War and the ongoing First Indochina War between France and the Viet Minh.

January 26, 1954 (Tuesday)

January 27, 1954 (Wednesday)

January 28, 1954 (Thursday)
Born:
Bruno Metsu, French football coach (d. 2013)
Kaneto Shiozawa, Japanese voice actor (d. 2000)

January 29, 1954 (Friday)
 Born:
 Christian Bjelland IV, Norwegian businessman and art collector
 Terry Kinney, American actor and director
 Oprah Winfrey, American talk show host, actress, and producer, founded Harpo Productions
 Yukinobu Hoshino, Japanese cartoonist

January 30, 1954 (Saturday)
Died:
John Murray Anderson, Canadian theater director and producer (b. 1886)
Dorothy Price, Irish physician (b. 1890), stroke

January 31, 1954 (Sunday)
Died:
Edwin Howard Armstrong, American electrical engineer (b. 1890), suicide by jumping
Florence Bates, American actress (b. 1888)

References

1954
1954-01
1954-01